Virginija Jasiūnaitė-Juršienė  (born 16 July 1950 Biržai) is a Lithuanian ceramic artist.

Life
She grew up in Vilnius, and graduated from M. K. Čiurlionis School of Art in sculpture, in 1974.  She studied from the Lithuanian Institute of Art. From 1976 to 1996, she was Vilnius Painting Factory artist, and member of the Lithuanian Artists' Association.

Works
Ceramic Works ("Aliens" in 1986, "Delay" in 1987, Meadow town "in 1996," Colourful portrait of 2004, "Women of nowhere" in 2005) post-modern in direction, characterized by conceptuality, experimentation.
Creator of assemblages, objects, installations ("unstable" in 2001, "The book – Inversion" in 2003, "Class" in 2004)

She participated in the Global Applied Arts Competition Kanadzava 1999.
Her works are in the collection of the Lithuanian Art Museum, National Museum of Fine Arts, Čiurlionis, and Lithuanian National Museum.

Solo exhibitions
1981 creative exhibition gallery in Erfurt, Germany
Creative Exhibition 1992 "ark", Vilnius
1992 Creative Exhibition Hall Art Gallery, Kedainiai
1993 Creative Exhibition Gallery of Medals, Vilnius
1996 Exhibition-figure pottery "Arka" gallery, Vilnius

See also
List of Lithuanian painters

References

External links
"Virginija Juršienė" Lithuanian Wikipedia
"Keramika", DEKORATYVINĖ VAZA – GELTONA

Lithuanian painters
1950 births
Living people
People from Biržai
Artists from Vilnius
Vilnius Academy of Arts alumni
20th-century Lithuanian women artists
21st-century Lithuanian women artists